This Is Our Year is a 2011 book by journalist Declan Bogue.

Content
An examination of the 2011 All-Ireland Senior Football Championship from the perspectives of ten Gaelic footballers from Ulster, the book achieved notoriety after Donegal footballer Kevin Cassidy was dropped from the team squad by manager Jim McGuinness over his contributions. Cassidy has not played for Donegal since. He released a statement in November 2011 saying it "appears my inter-county career is over".

At the post-match press conference following the 2012 All-Ireland Senior Football Championship Final Jim McGuinness declined to answer questions until Bogue was ejected. When Bogue was removed from the room McGuinness explained, 

Bogue has since responded with a public statement stating that although he holds no issue with McGuinness he would like to hear what he has taken issue with as no specific details were put forward by the Donegal man. He stands by his book and believes that he has no case to answer.

References

2011 All-Ireland Senior Football Championship
2011 non-fiction books
2011 in Gaelic football
Gaelic football controversies
Gaelic football in Ulster
Gaelic games books
History of the Donegal county football team